Scrubgrass Run is a  long 1st order tributary to Chartiers Creek in Allegheny County, Pennsylvania.

Course
Scrubgrass Run rises in Mt. Lebanon, Pennsylvania and then flows west-southwest to join Chartiers Creek across from Heidelberg.

Watershed
Scrubgrass Run drains  of area, receives about 38.5 in/year of precipitation, has a wetness index of 331.29, and is about 15% forested.

See also
 List of rivers of Pennsylvania

References

Rivers of Pennsylvania
Rivers of Allegheny County, Pennsylvania